The Crystal Cabin Award is the only international award for innovative aircraft cabin products and concepts and was granted for the first time at the Aircraft Interiors Expo in Hamburg in 2007.  An international judging panel made up of more than 20 academics, engineers, representatives of aircraft manufacturers and airlines along with specialist journalists evaluates the individual submissions and nominate three finalists in each category. The finalists are determined four weeks before the Aircraft Interiors Expo opens and the Award is granted.

Winners

2017

2016

2015

2014

2013

2012

2011

2010

2009

2008

2007

See also 

 Hamburg Aviation

References 

 https://web.archive.org/web/20150227123926/http://www.crystal-cabin-award.com/uploads/media/2011_04_AIX_Showcatalogue_CCA.pdf
 https://web.archive.org/web/20150227124256/http://www.crystal-cabin-award.com/uploads/media/Airlinerworld_Crystal_Cabin_Awards_2011.pdf
 https://web.archive.org/web/20150923211836/http://www.crystal-cabin-award.com/uploads/media/0311_CCA_AircraftInteriorsInternational_B_E.pdf
 http://www.pax-intl.com/industry-news/ifec-and-interiors/2013/04/16/2013-crystal-cabin-award-winners-celebrated-in-hamburg/
 http://www.pax-intl.com/industry-news/ifec-and-interiors/2013/04/17/thales-wins-crystal-cabin-award-and-announces-several-partnerships/
 http://www.futuretravelexperience.com/2013/04/crystal-cabin-award-and-the-bright-future-for-the-cabin-passenger-experience/
 http://www.news.com.au/travel/crystal-cabin-awards-include-a-toilet-for-big-bottoms-on-planes/story-e6frfq7r-1226614014188
 http://www.flightglobal.com/news/articles/interiors-crystal-cabin-award-finalists-face-judgement-day-383885/
 https://web.archive.org/web/20150227123622/http://acro.aero/awards.htm
 https://web.archive.org/web/20150227125555/http://www.hmgaerospace.com/news/show/8289

External links 
 Official Homepage

Business and industry awards
Aviation awards